Road Users' Code is a road users' guide published by the Transport Department of Hong Kong.

Overview
There is not a single law governing the rules of the road like other jurisdictions. Licensing and road maintenance are under the purview of the Transport Department and the Highways Department respectively.

There are several motoring laws in Hong Kong:

 Motor Vehicles Insurance (Third Party Risks) Ordinance – governs third party insurance for drivers
 Road Traffic (Driving-Offence Points) Ordinance – sets up a point system for breach of rules of the road
 Road Traffic Ordinance – regulates road traffic and use of vehicles

History
The Road Users' Code was preceded by a publication called the Highway Code, which was targeted almost exclusively toward motorists. In 1984, the Road Traffic (Amendment) Bill was announced. Among the provisions of the bill was to rename the Highway Code as the Road Users' Code in order to reflect that the updated publication was to provide guidance to all road users.

Secretary for transport Michael Leung formally announced the new booklet in April 1987. It was first published in June 1987. Updated editions were published in May 2000 and June 2020.

See also
The Highway Code, the British equivalent
Malta's The Highway Code, the Maltese equivalent
Driver's manual, equivalence in the United States

References

External links 
Digital version of Road Users' Code
Road Users' Code and the Law

Hong Kong
Law of Hong Kong
Transport in Hong Kong